Club Social Sport Pampas (sometimes referred as Sport Pampas) is a Peruvian football club, playing in the city of Tumbes, Peru.

History
The Club Social Sport Pampas was founded on May 5, 1964.

In 2000 Copa Perú, the club classified to the Regional Stage, but was eliminated by Atlético Grau in the Group Stage.

In 2006 Copa Perú, the club classified to the Regional Stage, but was eliminated by Juan Aurich in the Group Stage.

In 2009 Copa Perú, the club was 2009 Ligas Superior de Tumbes champion but was eliminated in the Departamental Stage.

In 2012 Copa Perú, the club classified to the Departamental Stage, but was eliminated when finished in 6th place.

In 2015 Copa Perú, the club classified to the Provincial Stage, but was eliminated in the Group Stage.

Honours

Regional
Liga Departamental de Tumbes:
Winners (3): 1983, 2000, 2006

Liga Superior de Tumbes:
Winners (1): 2009
Runner-up (1): 2012

Liga Distrital de Pampas de Hospital:
Winners (3): 2015, 2017, 2022

References

See also
List of football clubs in Peru
Peruvian football league system

Football clubs in Peru
Association football clubs established in 1964
1964 establishments in Peru